"I Wanna Be the Only One" is a song by British R&B girl group Eternal and American R&B/gospel singer BeBe Winans, released in May 1997 as the third single from the group's third album, Before the Rain (1997). Topping the UK Singles Chart, the release also became the group's third collaboration with Winans, who produced 1994's "Crazy" (from Always & Forever) and 1995's "It Will Never End" (from Power of a Woman). The single is the group's 11th non-consecutive top-10 entry on the UK Singles Chart.

"I Wanna Be the Only One" became Eternal's biggest hit to date; it was the third most-played song on British radio and the most-played song on European radio by a British act in 1997. It earned Eternal a MOBO Award and Capital FM Award for Best Single. It was also nominated for Best Single at the BRIT Awards. As of May 2019, the song has sold 728,000 copies in the UK. In June 2019, "I Wanna Be the Only One" was ranked at number 28 on the Official Charts Company's "Top 100 Girl Band Singles of the Last 25 Years".

Critical reception
Scottish Daily Record named "I Wanna Be the Only One" Single of the Week, viewing it as a "classy" number. A reviewer from Music Week rated it four out of five, describing it as "a gloriously commercial, uptempo tune. The result is superb and another top five hit." The magazine's Alan Jones called it "another surefire winner", "wherein the girls have a foil in the form of BeBe Winans. Bebe's rich gospel tones perfectly complement Eternal's on a smooth, perky, maddeningly commercial pop nugget which makes fine use of brass over a funky groove which moves at quite a pace." 

Claudia Connell from News of the World felt it is "a perfect summer song with a gentle gospel sound that shows off four lots of fine vocals." Ian Hyland from Sunday Mirror gave it eight out of ten, noting that "Eternal go seriously gospel with the soul legend that is BeBe Winans. The girls can do no wrong at the moment and if they don't crack America with the new stuff then they may as well give up. Top dance remixes as well."

Music video
A music video was produced to promote the single, directed by Randee St. Nicholas. It features the group performing in a basement, with a group of females surrounding them. Winans are surrounded by a group of men. These are battling each other. In the end, they all stand together, laughing into the camera. The video was filmed in Islington, London.

Track listings
 UK 7-inch jukebox single
A. "I Wanna Be the Only One" (radio edit)
B. "Don't You Love Me" (French remix)

 UK CD1
 "I Wanna Be the Only One"
 "A Friend Is a Friend"
 "Show Me"
 "Don't You Love Me" (French remix)

 UK CD2 – The Mixes
 "I Wanna Be the Only One"
 "I Wanna Be the Only One" (Black Box Lelewel 'Til the End mix)
 "I Wanna Be the Only One" (Paul Gotel Dark Skies mix)
 "I Wanna Be the Only One" (SPS Cained mix)
 "I Wanna Be the Only One" (Blacksmith "Eternal's Mix Tape")

Charts

Weekly charts

Year-end charts

Certifications

References

1997 singles
1997 songs
EMI Records singles
Eternal (band) songs
First Avenue Records singles
Music videos directed by Randee St. Nicholas
Number-one singles in Scotland
Songs written by BeBe Winans
Songs written by Rhett Lawrence
UK Singles Chart number-one singles
Male–female vocal duets